José Canalejas y Méndez (31 July 1854 – 12 November 1912) was a Spanish politician, born in Ferrol, who served as Prime Minister of Spain.

Early life
Son of a railway engineer, politician and editor of the newspaper  El Eco Ferrolano  José Canalejas y Casas and of María del Amparo Méndez Romero. He moved with his family to Madrid, and in October 1867 he enrolled in the Instituto San Isidro, "because at that time the incorporated schools could not teach the last two years of the six who made up the baccalaureate ». Already at the Central University of Madrid, he obtained the degrees of Law in 1871 and Philosophy in 1872, and the degree of doctor in both faculties. In 1873 he was assistant professor, but failed in two chair examinations, so he left teaching. He joined the company of the Railways of Madrid to Ciudad Real and Badajoz, where he became secretary general and He defended the company as a lawyer in lawsuits with other Spanish railway companies.

Political career
In 1881 Canalejas was elected deputy for Soria. Two years later, he was appointed under-secretary for the Prime Minister's department under Posada Herrera; he became minister of justice in 1888 and finance from 1894 to 1895. A brief spell as Minister of Agriculture, Industry and Commerce from March to May 1902 ended after only two months, when he resigned as he regarded the Sagasta Ministry weak and "incapable of safeguarding the Sovereignty of the State in view of the encroachments of the Vatican".

He served as President of the Congress of Deputies (the equivalent to the Anglo-Saxon office of parliamentary Speaker) from 1906 to 1907.

Canalejas Ministry 
In 1909, after the bloody confrontations of the "Tragic Week" in Barcelona,  Antonio Maura resigned and Segismundo Moret was again appointed prime minister. Moret was forced to resign in February 1910 when he was replaced by Canalejas who became Prime Minister and chief of the Liberal party. Moret denounced the Canalejas Ministry as "a democratic flag being used to cover reactionary merchandise".

While in office, Canalejas (with the support of his sovereign, Alfonso XIII) introduced several electoral reforms that aimed to win working-class support for moderately conservative policies; to curb the power of independent political bosses, quite common at the time, especially in rural areas; to weaken excesses of Catholic educational clericalism without threatening the Catholic Church as such; and to turn Spain into a true democracy. These policies successfully faced the social turmoil that radicals had been creating within Spain (and which had led, in 1909, to a brief but bloody unrest in Barcelona).

On 12 November 1912, while he was window-shopping the literary novelties of the day from a bookstore in central Madrid, he was fatally shot by anarchist Manuel Pardiñas.

Legacy
Canalejas believed in the possibility of a monarchy open to a thoroughgoing democratic policy both in economic and in civil and political matters. Salvador de Madariaga, the liberal historian, argued that the disasters Spain experienced during the 1930s could be traced to Canalejas' murder, given that this murder deprived King Alfonso of one of his few genuine statesmen.

References

External links 

 José Canalejas Méndez Proyecto Filosofía en español 
 José Canalejas Méndez Archivo Canalejas (In Spanish)
 José Canalejas Méndez Universidad Carlos III de Madrid - Biographical page in Spanish about "José Canalejas"
 

1854 births
1912 deaths
1912 murders in Europe
People from Ferrol, Spain
Liberal Party (Spain, 1880) politicians
19th-century Spanish lawyers
Prime Ministers of Spain
Economy and finance ministers of Spain
Presidents of the Congress of Deputies (Spain)
Assassinated Spanish politicians
Deaths by firearm in Spain
Members of the Royal Spanish Academy
People murdered in Spain
Assassinated heads of government
Justice ministers of Spain
Leaders of political parties in Spain
1910s murders in Spain